The Philippine national women's cricket team is the team that represents the Philippines in international women's cricket. In April 2018, the International Cricket Council (ICC) granted full Women's Twenty20 International (WT20I) status to all its members. Therefore, all Twenty20 matches played between the Philippines women and other ICC members since 1 July 2018 have been full WT20Is.

The Philippine Cricket Association planned to form a women's national team as early as 2017 and managed to gather enough players to form such a team in 2019. The team played its first WT20I matches during a series against Indonesia from 21 to 22 December 2019.

In December 2020, the ICC announced the qualification pathway for the 2023 ICC Women's T20 World Cup. The Philippines women's team were scheduled to make their debut at an ICC women's event at the 2021 ICC Women's T20 World Cup EAP Qualifier group; however, in August 2021, the International Cricket Council (ICC) confirmed that the tournament had been cancelled due to the COVID-19 pandemic. In December 2022, the Philippines toured Cambodia for a 6 match series, their first WT20I matches since their initial 2019 series against Indonesia, winning 1 out of the 6 matches (their first win in women's internationals).

Records and statistics 
International Match Summary — Indonesia Women
 
Last updated 23 December 2022

Twenty20 International 
T20I record versus other nations

Records complete to WT20I #1341. Last updated 23 December 2022.

See also
 List of Philippines women Twenty20 International cricketers

References

Women's
Women's national cricket teams
Cricket